The 1953–54 Czechoslovak Extraliga season was the 11th season of the Czechoslovak Extraliga, the top level of ice hockey in Czechoslovakia. 18 teams participated in the league, and ZSJ Spartak Praha Sokolovo won the championship.

Group A

Group B

Group C

Final

External links
History of Czechoslovak ice hockey

Czechoslovak Extraliga seasons
Czech
1953 in Czechoslovak sport
1954 in Czechoslovak sport